Astroviridae is a family of non-enveloped ssRNA viruses that cause infections in different animals. The family name is derived from the Greek word astron ("star") referring to the star-like appearance of spikes projecting from the surface of these small unenveloped viruses. Astroviruses were initially identified in humans but have since been isolated from other mammals and birds. This family of viruses consists of two genera, Avastrovirus (AAstV) and Mamastrovirus (MAstV). Astroviruses most frequently cause infection of the gastrointestinal tract but in some animals they may result in encephalitis (humans and cattle), hepatitis (avian) and nephritis (avian).

Astroviruses were first identified in humans in 1975 from the stool of children with diarrhea. Human infections are usually self-limiting but may also spread systematically and infect immunocompromised individuals.

Taxonomy
The International Committee on Taxonomy of Viruses (ICTV) established Astroviridae as a viral family in 1995. There have been over 50 astroviruses reported, although the ICTV officially recognizes 22 species. The genus Avastrovirus comprises three species: Chicken astrovirus (Avian nephritis virus types 1 - 3), Duck astrovirus (Duck astrovirus C-NGB), and Turkey astrovirus (Turkey astrovirus 1). The genus Mamastrovirus includes Bovine astroviruses 1 and 2, Human astrovirus (types 1-8), Feline astrovirus 1, Porcine astrovirus 1, Mink astrovirus 1 and Ovine astrovirus 1.

Types

Avastrovirus 
Avastroviruses are members of the Astroviridae family that infect birds. Avastrovirus 1-3 are associated with enteric infections in turkeys, ducks, chicken and guinea fowl. In turkey poults 1-3 weeks of age, some symptoms of enteritis include diarrhea, listlessness, liver eating and nervousness. These symptoms are usually mild but in cases of poult enteritis and mortality syndrome (PEMS), which has dehydration, immune dysfunction and anorexia as symptoms, mortality is high. Post mortem examination of the intestines of infected birds show fluid filled intestines. Hyperplasia of enterocytes is also observed in histopathology studies. However, in contrast to other enteric viruses, there isn't villous supply.

Avastrovirus species often infect extraintestinal sites such as the kidney or liver resulting in hepatitis and nephritis. Birds infected by avian nephritis virus typically die within 3 weeks of infection. The viral particles can be detected in fecal matter within 2 days and peak virus shedding occurs 4-5 days after infection. The virus can be found in the kidney, jejunum, spleen, liver and bursa of infected birds. Symptoms of this disease include diarrhea and weight loss. Necropsies show swollen and discolored kidneys and there is evidence of death of the epithelial cells and lymphocytic interstital nephritis. Another extraintestinal avastrovirus is avian hepatitis virus which infects ducks. Hepatitis in ducks caused by this Duck astrovirus (DAstV) is often fatal.

In birds, Avastroviruses are detected by antigen-capture ELISA. In the absence of vaccines, sanitation is the prevalent way to prevent Avastrovirus infections.

Mamastrovirus 
Mamastroviruses often cause gastroenteritis in infected mammals. In animals, gastroenteritis is usually undiagnosed because most astrovirus infections are asymptomatic. However, in mink and humans, astroviruses can cause diarrhea and can be fatal. The incubation period for Mamastrovirus is 1-4 days. When symptoms occur, the incubation period is followed by diarrhea for several days. In mink, symptoms include increased secretion from apocrine glands. Human astroviruses are associated with gastroenteritis in children and immunocompromised adults.  2-8% of acute non-bacterial gastroenteritis in children is associated with human astrovirus. These viral particles are usually detected in epithelial cells of the duodenum. In sheep, ovine astroviruses were found in the villi of the small intestine.

Mamastroviruses also cause diseases of the nervous system. These diseases most commonly occur in cattle, mink and humans. In cattle, this occurs sporadically and infects individual animals. Symptoms of this infection include seizure, lateral recumbency and impaired coordination. Histological examinations showed neuronal necrosis and gliosis of the cerebral cortex, cerebellum, spinal cord and brainstem.

Morphology
Astroviruses are 28-30 nm non-enveloped viruses with T-3 icosahedral symmetry. They have spherical shapes and consist of a capsid protein shell. Astroviruses have distinctive five or six pointed star-like projections on 10% of the virions (the other virions have smooth surfaces). The virion capsid is expressed from a subgenomic mRNA and its precursor undergoes multiple cleavages to make the VP70 protein. Capsids that are made of the VP70 protein are cleaved by trypsin to make particles that are very infectious (VP25/26, VP27/29 and VP34). The spikes that create the star-like appearance on the virion surface are made by two structural proteins (VP25 and VP27) while the capsid shell is made from VP34.

Genome
Astrovirus genomes are positive sense single stranded RNA of 6.4-7.4 kb. The genomes have a 3' polyadenylated end but lack a 5' cap. The 5' and 3' ends have untranslated regions with lengths that vary depending on the strain. Astrovirus genomes have three overlapping reading frames (ORFs) that code for polyproteins. ORF1a and ORF 1b are found at the 5' end while ORF2 is found at the 3' end. ORF1a and ORF1b cover half of the genome and they both encode the non-structural proteins such as RNA-dependent RNA polymerase, membrane associated proteins, Nucleoside triphosphate binding protein (NTP-binding protein) and proteases which play different roles in RNA transcription and replication. ORF2 encodes structural proteins.

Replication
Replication of astroviruses occur in the cytoplasm. Astrovirus RNA is infectious and functions as a messenger RNA for ORF1a and ORF1b. A frame-shifting mechanism between these two nonstructural polypeptides translates RNA-dependent RNA polymerase. In replication complexes near intracellular membranes, ORF1a and ORF1b are cleaved to generate individual nonstructural proteins that are involved in replication. The resulting subgenomic RNA contains ORF2 and encodes precursor capsid protein (VP90). VP90 is proteolytically cleaved during packaging and produces immature capsids made of VP70. Following encapsidation, immature capsids are released from the cell without lysis. Extracellular virions are cleaved by Trypsin and form mature infectious virions.

References

External links
 Viralzone: Astroviridae
 ICTV
  African wildlife diseases 

Viral diseases
 
Gastroenterology
Foodborne illnesses
Riboviria
Virus families